César Jesús Remón Aguirre (born 2 October 1985 in Logroño, La Rioja) is a Spanish former footballer who played as a midfielder.

References

External links

1985 births
Living people
Sportspeople from Logroño
Spanish footballers
Footballers from La Rioja (Spain)
Association football midfielders
Segunda División players
Segunda División B players
Tercera División players
Deportivo Alavés B players
CD Castellón footballers
CD Dénia footballers
Ontinyent CF players
CD Alcoyano footballers
UCAM Murcia CF players
UD Logroñés players